The Arab Museum of Contemporary Art and Heritage (AMOCAH or AMOCA) is a Contemporary Art Museum in Arab city Sakhnin in Israel.

History
The Arab Museum of Contemporary Art and Heritage is the first Arab museum of Contemporary Art, established in Israel. It was founded by two Israeli artists Belu-Simion Fainaru and Avital Bar-Shay. After curating several Mediterranean Biennales they decided that the idea of exhibiting Arab, Jewish and Mediterranean artists together worth a museum collection. The museum was inaugurated in June 2015 by Sakhnin Mayor Mazen Gnaim and President's Reuven Rivlin wife Nechamia Rivlin. The Mediterranean Biennale are planned to continue as part of the museum activity program. Current status of the museum is that it await the official recognition of Israeli Ministry of Culture and can be defined as Private Museum by Israeli law.

First Arab museum in Israel controversy
Sayid Abu Shaqra, the owner of Umm al-Fahm Art Gallery opposes the declaration of AMOCA as the first Arab museum in Israel. The original plans was to turn Umm al-Fahm Art Gallery into a modern art museum, but after the inauguration of the project, it was cancelled due to a funding issues.

Collection and exhibitions
Museum's opening exhibition was called "Hiwar" which means "dialogue" in Arabic. The exhibition included works of artists such Adel Abdessemed, Marina Abramović, Larry Abramson, Asad Azi, Raed Bawayah, Matei Bejenaru, Bashir Borlakov, Daniel Buren, Thorsten Brinkmann, Barbara Eichhorn, Mounir Fatmi, Belu-Simion Fainaru, Mekhitar Garabedian, Jeanno Gaussi, Moshe Gershuni, Maïmouna Patrizia Guerresi, Rawan Ismail, Nidal Jabarin, Huda Jamal, Muhammad Said Kallash, Dani Karavan, Jannis Kounellis, Mehdi-Georges Lahlou, Almagul Menlibayeva, Bohtaina Abu Milhem, Shirin Neshat, Herman Nitsch, Zohdy Qadry, Anahita Razmi, Valentin Ruhry, Angelika Sher, Eva Shlegel, Cengiz Tekin, Jesica Vaturi, Maria Vedder, Johannes Vogl, Micha Ullman, David Wakstain and Runi Zaraw.
The museum permanent collection currently contains about 200 work of arts.

References

External links
Arab-Jewish art museum opens
AMOCA in ArtMarket magazine

Contemporary art galleries in Israel
Arab art scene